Jason Charles Percival (born 20 September 1973) is an English former professional footballer who played in the Football League for Exeter City.

Career
Percival was born in Nuneaton and began his career with Stoke City. He failed to break into the first team at Stoke and joined Second Division side Exeter City in 1993 where he made four appearances. He went on to play for non-league sides Nuneaton Borough, Hinckley Town, Atherstone United, Evesham United and finished his career with Barwell.

Career statistics
Source:

References

1973 births
Living people
English footballers
Association football forwards
English Football League players
Stoke City F.C. players
Nuneaton Borough F.C. players
Exeter City F.C. players
Hinckley Town F.C. players
Atherstone Town F.C. players
Evesham United F.C. players